This is a list of diplomatic missions in Nepal. At present, the capital of Kathmandu hosts 25 embassies. Many other countries have non-resident embassies either resident in New Delhi or elsewhere.(Including honorary consulates).

Diplomatic missions in Kathmandu

Embassies 

 

 

 
 

 (Embassy)

Other missions or delegations 
 (Delegation)

Consular missions

Birgunj 
 (Consulate-General)

Non-resident embassies accredited to Nepal 
Resident in New Delhi, India.

 

 

 

 

 

 

 

 

 

 

Other Resident Locations:
 (Dhaka)
 (Abu Dhabi)

Embassy to open

Closed missions

References

External links 
 Kathmandu Diplomatic List

Diplomatic missions
Nepal